Agios Nikolaos Lefkas is an abandoned village in the Nicosia District of Cyprus, and it lies within the UN Buffer Zone. In 1946, the village had a population of 132. This declined to 67 by the time of the 1960 census and the village was abandoned altogether with the creation of the UN Buffer Zone.

References

Cyprus dispute
Communities in Nicosia District
Greek Cypriot villages depopulated during the 1974 Turkish invasion of Cyprus
Former populated places in Cyprus